The Colleen Bawn is a 1911 Australian silent film directed by Gaston Mervale starring Louise Lovely. It is adapted from a popular melodrama by Dion Boucicault.

It is considered a lost film.

Plot
Hardess Cregan is an impoverished Irish aristocrat whose mother wants him to marry Anne Chute, an heiress, in order to restore the family fortunes. However he falls in love and marries a peasant girl, Eily O'Connor (Louise Lovely). Hardess' servant Danny (James Martin) tries to murder the girl but she is rescued by a villager and hidden away. Thinking she is dead, Hardess is about to marry Anne and is about to be arrested for Eily's murder when she reappears. Hardress is released, Eily is accepted by Mrs Cregan, Anne and Kyrle are reconciled and Anne offers to pay off the Cregans' debt.

Production
A cliff and a cave on Sydney harbour were used for the scene of the attempted murder and the rescue of the colleen. The rest of the movie was shot in the studio of Australian Life Biograph Company in Manly.

Release
A British version of the same play, shot in Ireland, appeared in cinemas the same year.

Cast
Louise Carbasse as Eily O'Connor
James Martin as Danny Mann

References

External links

Full text of play

1911 films
Australian drama films
Australian black-and-white films
Australian silent feature films
Lost Australian films
1911 drama films
Melodrama films
1911 lost films
Lost drama films
Films directed by Gaston Mervale
Silent drama films